Alphonso Hart (July 4, 1830 – December 23, 1910) was a Republican politician from the U.S. State of Ohio who was a U.S. Representative, in the Ohio State Senate, and the 11th lieutenant governor of Ohio.

Biography
Hart was born in Vienna Township, Trumbull County, Ohio. His father died when he was age twelve, and he was bound out to a farmer for three years. After seven months he started out alone. Hart attended the common schools and Grand River Institute, Austinburg, Ohio, and studied law in Warren, Ohio. He was admitted to the bar August 12, 1851.  Hart was married to Phebe Peck of Warren in 1856.

Career
He moved to New Lisbon, Ohio, remained two years, and was then elected Assistant Clerk of the Ohio House of Representatives. He purchased the Democratic newspaper "Portage Sentinel" in Ravenna, Ohio, which he edited until he sold it in 1857. He also practiced in Ravenna. He served as prosecuting attorney for Portage County from 1861 to 1864, when he resigned.  He served as member of the Ohio Senate 1865, 1872, and 1874, and was the 11th Lieutenant Governor of Ohio 1874-1876. Presidential elector for Grant/Wilson in 1872. In 1874 he moved to Cleveland, Ohio, and in 1878 to Hillsboro, Ohio. In 1880 he was nominated for the Forty-seventh Congress in the seventh district but lost to John P. Leedom. Hart was elected as a Republican to the Forty-eighth Congress in the 12th district (March 4, 1883 – March 3, 1885). He was an unsuccessful candidate for election to the Forty-ninth Congress.  He served as Solicitor of Internal Revenue, Treasury Department from 1888 to 1892.  He resumed the practice of law in Washington, D.C.

Death
Hart's wife, Phebe, died in 1868. They had a son and a daughter. Hart died in 1910 and is interred in Maple Grove Cemetery, Ravenna, Portage County, Ohio US.

References

External links

Lieutenant Governors of Ohio
1830 births
1910 deaths
Ohio state senators
United States Department of the Treasury officials
People from Vienna Township, Trumbull County, Ohio
County district attorneys in Ohio
1872 United States presidential electors
Washington, D.C., Republicans
19th-century American politicians
Grand River Academy alumni
Republican Party members of the United States House of Representatives from Ohio